Fabián Ernesto Alarcón Rivera (born 14 April 1947) was President of Ecuador from 6 February 1997 to 9 February 1997 and from 11 February 1997 to 10 August 1998.

Life
Alarcón was born in Quito. His father, Ruperto Alarcón, was a former president of the Chamber of Deputies. He was the President of the National Congress from 1991 to 1992 and then again from August 1995 to February 1997, when he was made acting president due to the impeachment of President Abdalá Bucaram. This deepened the political crisis in Ecuador as vice-president Rosalía Arteaga challenged Alarcón's assumption of the presidency. Arteaga then became president for two days but Alarcón was then restored. He gave up the presidency after early elections were held in 1998, in which he did not run. In 1999 he was arrested on corruption charges, but was later released. Alarcón is a member of the Alfarista Radical Front.
He continues to receive a lifetime pension from the Ecuadorian government of $ 38,800 annually.

He ran for mayor of Quito in 1988 and 1992, losing both times.

References

External links
 Official Website of the Ecuadorian Government about the country President's History
 Biography by CIDOB

1947 births
Living people
People from Quito
Presidents of Ecuador
Alfarista Radical Front politicians
Presidents of the National Congress (Ecuador)
Heads of government who were later imprisoned
Recipients of the Medal of the Oriental Republic of Uruguay